Modo is a member-owned carshare operator in British Columbia. It was incorporated in 1997, making it the oldest carsharing organization in the area, the first carshare co-op in North America and the first carshare in the English-speaking world. Modo amalgamated with the Victoria Carshare Co-op in 2015 and now serves 25 municipalities in the Lower Mainland and Greater Victoria.

As of 2021, Modo had over 25,000 individual and business members and a fleet of approximately 700 vehicles, including cars, trucks, SUVs, passenger and cargo vans, hybrids, battery electric vehicles and hydrogen fuel cell vehicles. Modo has vehicles across British Columbia, including Vancouver, UBC, Richmond, Surrey, New Westminster, Burnaby, North Vancouver, Coquitlam, Port Moody, Victoria, Oak Bay, Esquimalt and Saanich, and at the Horseshoe Bay, Tsawwassen, Langdale and Swartz Bay ferry terminals.

Modo offers two-way, roundtrip carsharing. Each of its vehicles has a designated parking space, with cars picked up and dropped off at the same location. Vehicles can be booked in 15 minute increments, with a 30-minute minimum and a 30-day maximum. Members book online, by phone or using an app, and access the vehicles using a fob.

History 

 In October 2014, Victoria Car Share was merged into Modo. Then in June 2018, Modo acquired the Okanagan Car Share Co-op in Kelowna.

 Since July 2016, Modo's CEO is Patrick Nangle, a former Purolator executive.

 In June 2017, Modo entered into a partnership with TransLink to provide vehicles for the transit authority's Vanpool pilot project. 

 In July 2018, Modo began allowing drivers with a learner's licenses to use its fleet of vehicles, making it the first carshare in North America to do so.

 In August 2018, Modo, along with Coast Car Co-op, became permanently located at the Langdale Ferry Terminal in Gibson, British Columbia.

References

External links

 

Carsharing
Companies based in Vancouver
Companies based in Victoria, British Columbia
Transport companies established in 1997
Transport in Greater Vancouver
Transport in Victoria, British Columbia